Impossible à aimer is the seventh studio album by Cœur de pirate, released in 2021. The album was the winner of the Juno Award for Francophone Album of the Year at the Juno Awards of 2022.

Track listing

References

2021 albums
Cœur de pirate albums
Juno Award for Francophone Album of the Year albums